Grenville Channel is a strait on the North Coast of British Columbia, Canada, between Pitt Island and the mainland to the south of Prince Rupert.

The Grenville Channel Fault that forms the channel dates back to the Cretaceous Era. Both sides are mountainous and densely wooded, and a linear magnetic anomaly runs parallel to the channel south of 51"30'N.

See also
Baker Inlet
Pa-aat River
Kumealon Inlet
Kxngeal Inlet
Klewnuggit Inlet Marine Provincial Park
Lowe Inlet Marine Provincial Park
Union Passage Marine Provincial Park

References

External links

North Coast of British Columbia
Channels of British Columbia